Lee Kyu-Chul (born May 1, 1982) is a South Korean football player.

He has formerly played for K-League sides Gwangju Sangmu, Daejeon Citizen and Korea National League side Yongin City FC.

Career statistics 
As of end of 2008 season

References
K-League player record 
Korean FA Cup match result 

1982 births
Living people
Association football defenders
South Korean footballers
Daejeon Hana Citizen FC players
Gimcheon Sangmu FC players
K League 1 players
Korea National League players